Carlos Noriega (born 27 February 1972) is a Bolivian judoka. He competed in the men's extra-lightweight event at the 1992 Summer Olympics.

References

1972 births
Living people
Bolivian male judoka
Olympic judoka of Bolivia
Judoka at the 1992 Summer Olympics
Place of birth missing (living people)